Timothy Sydney Robert Hardy  (29 October 1925 – 3 August 2017) was an English actor who had a long career in theatre, film and television. He began his career as a classical actor and later earned widespread recognition for roles such as Siegfried Farnon in the BBC television series All Creatures Great and Small, Cornelius Fudge in the Harry Potter film series and Winston Churchill in several productions, beginning with the Southern Television series Winston Churchill: The Wilderness Years. He was nominated for the BAFTA for Best Actor for All Creatures Great and Small in 1980 and Winston Churchill: The Wilderness Years in 1982. Aside from acting, Hardy was an acknowledged expert on the medieval English longbow and wrote two books on the subject.

Early life
Hardy was born in Cheltenham in 1925 to Henry Harrison Hardy, MBE, of Old Farm, Bishop's Cleeve, Tewkesbury, Gloucestershire, and Edith Jocelyn, daughter of Rev. Sydney Dugdale, rector of Whitchurch, Shropshire, a member of a landed gentry family of Wroxall Abbey, Wroxall, Warwickshire. Henry Hardy was the headmaster of Cheltenham College and later of Shrewsbury School, and a Major in the Rifle Brigade.

Hardy was educated at Rugby School and Magdalen College, Oxford, where his studies were interrupted by service in the Royal Air Force during World War II. He trained as a pilot, receiving part of his instruction in the British Flying Training School Program in Terrell, Texas. Although he visited Los Angeles when on leave from flight training at Terrell, his later acting career never gained a foothold in Hollywood. After service in the RAF, he returned to gain a BA (Hons) in English. On BBC Radio 4's Desert Island Discs he described the degree he obtained as "shabby", although he treasured the time spent studying under C. S. Lewis and J. R. R. Tolkien.

Career
Hardy began his career as a classical actor. In 1959, he appeared as The King of France in "All's Well that Ends Well" in April 1959, directed by Tyrone Guthrie at Stratford-upon-Avon, with Vanessa Redgrave and Diana Rigg indicated as supporting extras. He subsequently appeared as Sicinius opposite Laurence Olivier in Coriolanus at Stratford-upon-Avon, directed by Peter Hall. In this production, Ian Holm featured as a "Third Aufidious Servant", Vanessa Redgrave as Valeria, and Diana Rigg as a "Roman Citizen". Albert Finney featured as a "First Roman Citizen". Hardy then appeared in Shakespeare's Henry V on stage and in television's An Age of Kings (1960), and subsequently played Coriolanus in The Spread of the Eagle (BBC, 1963) and Sir Toby Belch for the BBC Television Shakespeare production of Twelfth Night in 1980. Over the years, Hardy played a range of parts on television and film. His first continuing role in a TV series was as businessman Alec Stewart in the award-winning oil company drama The Troubleshooters for the BBC, which he played from 1966 to 1970. He won further acclaim for his portrayal of the mentally-unhinged Abwehr Sgt. Gratz in LWT's 1969 war drama Manhunt. In 1975, Hardy portrayed Albert, Prince Consort in the award-winning 13-hour serial Edward the Seventh (known as Edward the King to the American audience), which he regarded as one of his best performances. "I thought I'd done a good job there, although I believe the Royal Family didn't like it all. There are always people who don't like what one does."

He was seen as the irascible senior veterinary surgeon Siegfried Farnon in the long-running All Creatures Great and Small (1978–90), an adaptation of James Herriot's semi-autobiographical books. Hardy also made an appearance in the 1986–88 ITV comedy series Hot Metal, in which he played the dual roles of newspaper proprietor Twiggy Rathbone (who bore more than a passing resemblance to Rupert Murdoch) and his editor, Russell Spam. In 1993 Hardy appeared in an episode of Inspector Morse, playing Andrew Baydon in "Twilight of the Gods". In 1994, he played Arthur Brooke in the BBC production of Middlemarch. In 2002, he played the role of pompous and eccentric Professor Neddy Welch in a WTTV/WGBH Boston co-production of Lucky Jim, adapted from the novel by Kingsley Amis. It aired originally as part of the Masterpiece series on PBS in the U.S. and starred Stephen Tompkinson in the title role of Jim Dixon, a luckless lecturer at a provincial British university.

Hardy played both Winston Churchill and Franklin D. Roosevelt, each on more than one occasion. He played Churchill most notably in Winston Churchill: The Wilderness Years (1981), for which he was nominated for a BAFTA award, but also in The Sittaford Mystery, Bomber Harris and War and Remembrance.  On 20 August 2010, he read Churchill's famous wartime address "Never was so much owed by so many to so few" at a ceremony to mark the 70th anniversary of the speech. He played Roosevelt in the BBC serial, Bertie and Elizabeth, and in the French TV mini-series, Le Grand Charles, about the life of Charles de Gaulle. He also played Robert Dudley, Earl of Leicester, in Elizabeth R and took the role of Sir John Middleton in the 1995 film version of Sense and Sensibility.

His big screen roles included Professor Krempe in Mary Shelley's Frankenstein and Minister for Magic Cornelius Fudge in the ''Harry Potter films.

His voice performance as Robin Hood in Tale Spinners For Children, an LP from the 1960s, is considered one of the best Robin Hood renditions. His voice was also the voice of D'Artagnan in The Three Musketeers and of Frédéric Chopin, in The Story of Chopin.

Awards
Hardy was appointed a Commander of the Order of the British Empire (CBE) in the 1981 Birthday Honours.

Personal life
His first marriage, in 1952, was to Elizabeth Fox, the daughter of Sir Lionel Fox; they had a son, Paul. This marriage ended in 1956. In 1961 he married Sally Pearson, the daughter of the baronet Sir Neville Pearson and Dame Gladys Cooper as well as a half-sister of John Buckmaster and a sister-in-law of Robert Morley. From this marriage, which ended in 1986, Hardy had two other children, one of whom is Justine Hardy, a journalist, activist and psychotherapist who founded Healing Kashmir.

He was a close friend of actor Richard Burton, whom he met at Oxford University. He shared some memories of their wartime friendship and read extracts from Burton's newly published diaries at the Cheltenham Literature Festival in 2012.

While playing Henry V, Hardy developed an interest in medieval warfare, and in 1963 he wrote and presented an acclaimed television documentary on the subject of the Battle of Agincourt. He also wrote two books on the subject of the longbow, Longbow: A Social and Military History and The Great Warbow: From Hastings to the Mary Rose with Matthew Strickland. He was one of the experts consulted by the archaeologist responsible for raising the Mary Rose. He was Master of the Worshipful Company of Bowyers of the City of London from 1988 to 1990. In 1996 he was elected a Fellow of the Society of Antiquaries.

In February 2013, Hardy withdrew from his scheduled performance as Winston Churchill in Peter Morgan's play, The Audience, after suffering cracked ribs as the result of a fall.

Hardy died on 3 August 2017, aged 91, at Denville Hall, a home for retired actors.

TV and filmography

Films

Television
David Copperfield (1956) ... David Copperfield
An Age of Kings (1960)
The Spread of the Eagle (1963) .... Coriolanus
The Troubleshooters (1966–1970)
The Baron (1966), episode "A Memory of Evil" 
The Saint (1968), series 6, episode 4, "The Desperate Diplomat" .... Walter Faber
Manhunt (1969) .... Abwehr Sgt. Graz
Elizabeth R (1971) .... Robert Dudley
The Stalls of Barchester (1971)... Dr. Haynes
The Incredible Robert Baldick (1972) .... Sir Robert Baldick
The Gathering Storm (1974) .... Joachim von Ribbentrop
Edward the Seventh (1975) .... Albert, Prince Consort
Upstairs, Downstairs (1975), series 5, episode 8, "Such A Lovely Man"
The Duchess of Duke Street (1976) Episode: "A Lady of Virtue" ... George Duggan 
All Creatures Great and Small (1978–1980 and 1988–1990; entire series) .... Siegfried Farnon
Twelfth Night (1980) 
The Pied Piper of Hamelin (1980), narrator of BAFTA winning animation by Cosgrove Hall Films
Winston Churchill: The Wilderness Years (1981), Winston Churchill
The Zany Adventures of Robin Hood (1984) .... King Richard
Jenny's War (1985) .... Klein
Hot Metal (1986–1988) .... Terence "Twiggy" Rathbone
Northanger Abbey (1987) .... General Tilney
War and Remembrance (1988) .... Winston Churchill
The Case-Book of Sherlock Holmes, episode "The Master Blackmailer" (1992) .... Charles Augustus Milverton
Middlemarch (1994) .... Mr. Brooke
Gulliver's Travels (1996) ....TV Mini-Series, Dr. Parnell
Castle Ghosts of England, Scotland, Wales, and Ireland (1997) .... Host
Inspector Morse (1993), series 7, episode 3, "Twilight of the Gods"
Midsomer Murders (1999), series 2, episode 3, "Dead Man's Eleven" - Robert Cavendish
The 10th Kingdom (2000) .... Chancellor Griswold
The Lost World (2001) .... Professor Illingworth
Foyle's War, "The German Woman" 
 The Falklands Play (2002) .... Anthony Parsons (HM Ambassador to the UN)
 Lucky Jim (2003) .... 	Professor Neddy Welch
Spooks (2003), second series, episode 4, "Blood and Money" .... Governor of the Bank of England
Making Waves (2004)
Agatha Christie's Marple, series 2, episode 4, "The Sittaford Mystery" (2006) .... Winston Churchill
Little Dorrit (2008) .... Tite Barnacle
Margaret (2009) .... Willie Whitelaw
Lewis, series 4, episode 2, "Dark Matter" (2010)
Churchill: 100 Days That Saved Britain (2015) .... Winston Churchill

References

External links

Robert Hardy(Aveleyman)

1925 births
2017 deaths
20th-century English male actors
21st-century English male actors
Alumni of Magdalen College, Oxford
Commanders of the Order of the British Empire
English male film actors
English male stage actors
English male television actors
Fellows of the Society of Antiquaries of London
Male actors from Gloucestershire
People educated at Rugby School
People from Cheltenham
English military historians
Royal Air Force pilots of World War II